Desjardins (French, of the gardens) is a common last name in French-speaking Canada and is the name of:

 Alice Desjardins, former judge of the Canadian Federal Court of Appeal
 Alphonse Desjardins (co-operator) (1850-1920), co-founder of the Caisses populaires Desjardins (today Desjardins Group), a forerunner of North American credit unions
 André Desjardins (1930–2000), Canadian union official
 Andrew Desjardins (born 1986), Canadian professional ice hockey player
 Anne Desjardins (born 1951), Canadian chef and Knight of the National Order of Quebec
 Anne Heurgon-Desjardins (1899–1977), French philanthropist
 Antoine Émile Ernest Desjardins (1823,-1886), French historian, geographer and archaeologist
 Arnaud Desjardins (1925–2011), French author
 Cédrick Desjardins (born 1985), Canadian professional ice hockey goaltender
 Charles-Alfred Desjardins (1846–1934),  farmer, merchant, manufacturer and political figure
 Christophe Desjardins (1962–2020), French contemporary violist
 Daniel "Boom" Desjardins (born 1971), French Canadian singer
 Denys Desjardins (born 1966), Canadian film director, cinematographer, and film historian 
 Dorimène Roy Desjardins, co-founder of the Caisses populaires Desjardins
 Éric Desjardins (born 1969), Canadian professional ice hockey player
 François Desjardins (born 1970), Canadian President and CEO of the Laurentian Bank 
 Gabriel Desjardins (born 1949), Progressive Conservative member of the House of Commons of Canada
 Gerard Ferdinand Desjardins (born 1944), Canadian former ice hockey goaltender 
 Huguette Desjardins (born 1938), Canadian artist
 Jacques Desjardins, Canadian composer
 Jacques Guérin-Desjardins, French politician, National Commissioner of Eclaireurs Unionistes de France (1923-36)
 Julien François Desjardins (1799–1840), French zoologist
 Laurent Desjardins (1923-2012), Canadian politician 
 Lisa Desjardins (born 1972), American journalist
 Louis-Georges Desjardins (1849–1928), Canadian journalist and politician
 Marcel Desjardins (born 1966), General Manager for the Ottawa Redblacks
 Marcel Desjardins (journalist) (1941–2003), Canadian journalist, news editor and director 
 Marie desJardins, American computer scientist
 Marie-Catherine Desjardins (1640–1683), usually referred to as Marie-Catherine de Villedieu, a 17th-century French author
 Martin Desjardins, French sculptor and stuccoist of Dutch birth
 Martin Desjardins (ice hockey) (born 1967), Canadian retired professional ice hockey forward 
 Marty Jannetty (born 1960), American professional wrestler
 Paul Desjardins (born 1943), former all-star professional Canadian football offensive lineman 
 Paule Desjardins, French singer who represented France in the Eurovision Song Contest 1957
 Pete Desjardins, American diver, participated in 1924 and 1928 Summer Olympics
 Pierre Desjardins (born 1941), former professional Canadian football player 
 Raynald Desjardins (born 1953), Canadian mobster
 Richard Desjardins, singer-songwriter, actor, and documentary film maker from the Canadian province of Quebec
 Robert Desjardins (born 1967), Canadian professional goaltender 
 Robert Desjardins (curler) (born 1970), Canadian curler
 Samuel Desjardins (1852–1924), Canadian politician
 Susan Y. Desjardins, American major general and Director, Plans and Policy (J5), Headquarters U.S. Strategic Command
 Thierry Desjardins (born 1941), French reporter and pamphleteer
 Vic Desjardins (1898–1988), American-born ice hockey player
 Wilbrod "Willie" Desjardins (born 1957), Canadian professional ice hockey coach and player
 Yvan Desjardins (born 1975), Canadian figure skating coach and former competitor

See also
 Dejardin (disambiguation)
 Desjardins (disambiguation)

French-language surnames